The 2010 Jade Solid Gold Best Ten Music Awards Presentation (Chinese: 2010年度十大勁歌金曲頒獎典禮) was held on January 15, 2011. It is part of the Jade Solid Gold Best Ten Music Awards Presentation series.

Top 10 song awards
The top 10 songs (十大勁歌金曲) of 2010 are as follows.

Additional awards

References
 2010 Jade Solid Gold Best 10 Music Awards Results

Cantopop
Jade Solid Gold Best Ten Music Awards Presentation, 2010